The ladies' individual skating event was held as part of the figure skating at the 1924 Winter Olympics. It was the third appearance of the event, which had previously been held at the Summer Olympics in 1908 and 1920. The competition was held on Monday, 28 January and on Tuesday, 29 January 1924. It was the only women's event at the 1924 Winter Olympics. Eight figure skaters from six nations competed.

Results
Although eleven-year-old Sonja Henie finished last in this competition, she went on to win gold medals in the next three consecutive Olympic Games.

Referee:
  Alexander von Szabo de Bucs

Judges:
  J. Fellner
  Walter Jakobsson
  Herbert Yglesias
  Ernst Herz
  Louis Magnus
  R. Japiut
  Georges Wagemans

References

External links
 Official Official Olympic Report
 sports-reference
 

Figure skating at the 1924 Winter Olympics
1924 in figure skating
Alp
OLy